Barkha is a 1959 Indian Hindi-language drama film directed by Krishnan–Panju and produced by A. V. Meiyappan. It is a remake of the Tamil film Thai Pirandhal Vazhi Pirakkum (1958). The film stars Jagdeep and Nanda. It was a commercial success.

Cast 
 Jagdeep as Ajit
 Nanda as Parvati
 Shobha Khote as Madhu
 Leela Chitnis as Mrs. Haridas
 Anant Kumar as Dr. Manohar
 David as Zamindar Haridas
 Mukri as Shambu
 Ulhas as the inspector

Production 
Barkha was a remake of the Tamil film Thai Pirandhal Vazhi Pirakkum, released in 1958. It was directed by the duo Krishnan–Panju, and produced by A. V. Meiyappan under AVM Productions. This film included a bullfight not present in the original. Lead actor Jagdeep was paid  as a monthly salary, and lead actress Nanda was paid .

Soundtrack 
The soundtrack was composed by Chitragupta. All songs of the film were written by Rajendra Krishan. The song "Ek Raat Mein Do Do Chand Khile" attained popularity.

Reception 

References

Bibliography

External links 
 

1960 drama films
1960 films
1960s Hindi-language films
AVM Productions films
Films directed by Krishnan–Panju
Hindi remakes of Tamil films
Hindi-language drama films
Indian drama films